Teri Meri Ik Jindri  is a 1975 Punjabi film starring Dharmendra, Veerendra, and Meena Rai movie had very popular song like 
"Terian Mohabtan Nemaa Sutea sang by Narinder Biba, an  Sital Singh Sital .

 Cast 
 Dharmendra as Superman's Dad ( Special Appearance)
 Veerendra as Jeetiaa Meena Rai
 Jeevan as Jagga Daku Johnny Walker as Sadhu (Zaildara)
 Mehar Mittal as Hansu (Hai-ka-na)
 Rajendra Kumar as Jaggar Singh Fauji (Special Appearance)
 Mehmood Junior as LatooMusic

The music for Teri Meri Ek Jindri'' is composed by S. Mohinder an all songs lyrics by Inderjit Hasanpuri . The soundtrack album was released on H.M.V February 5, 1975. The album consists of 9 songs.

References

External links
 

1975 films
Punjabi-language Indian films
1970s Hindi-language films
1970s Punjabi-language films